Hans-Jürgen Naumann (born 1 April 1944) is a retired German football midfielder.

References

1944 births
Living people
German footballers
1. FC Lokomotive Leipzig players
DDR-Oberliga players
Association football midfielders
East Germany international footballers